Göllü is a village in the Artuklu District of Mardin Province in Turkey. The village is populated by Arabs of the Tat tribe, Assyrians and Kurds and had a population of 843 in 2021.

References 

Villages in Artuklu District
Arab settlements in Mardin Province
Kurdish settlements in Mardin Province
Assyrian communities in Turkey